Aa Gaye Munde U.K. De or Munde U.K. De 2 (English: Here Comes The UK Boys.) is a 2014 Punjabi romantic comedy film directed by Manmohan Singh and produced by Sunny Trehan/Trehan Productions. The film features Jimmy Sheirgill, Neeru Bajwa, Gurpreet Ghuggi, Binnu Dhillon, Khushboo Grewal, Om Puri and Gugu Gill. Aa Gaye Munde U.K. De was released on 8 August 2014.

Aa Gaye Munde U.K. De is a sequel to the Munde U.K. De. The trailer was launched on 10 July 2014.

Cast
Jimmy Sheirgill as Roopinder Grewal aka Roop 
Neeru Bajwa as Disha Dhillon 
Om Puri as Disha's Father - Dilip Singh Dhillon
Khushboo Grewal as Lovely 
Binnu Dhillon as Mintoo
Navneet Nishan as Roopinder's Mother - Mrs. Grewal
Gugu Gill Roopinder's Father - Harjit Singh Grewal
Gurpreet Ghuggi as Roop's Best Friend DJ - Daljeet Jugaadi
Inana Sran as Kindar Chawla
Rana Ranbir as Mohan Singh aka Mohnii
Sangeeta Gupta as Mittho - Mohnii's Wife
Satinder Sidhu as Disha's Mother - Jeet Kaur Dhillon
Karamjeet Brar as Shera - Mohnii's Worker
Harpal Singh Pali as Kindar's Father - Prof. Chawla
Gurleen Chopra as Dolly (cameo)

Soundtrack 

The soundtrack of Aa Gaye Munde U.K. De was composed by Jatinder Shah while the lyrics were written by Kumaar & Veet Baljit.

Awards and nominations

References 

2014 films
Punjabi-language Indian films
2010s Punjabi-language films
Films scored by Jatinder Shah